José Ribamar Coelho Santos (born 11 April 1966), better known by his stage name Zeca Baleiro, is a Brazilian MPB artist. One of his most famous songs is "Salão de Beleza", which was featured on Putumayo World Music's Reggae Around the World compilation. Along with being a solo artist, he has also worked with guitarist Pedro Joia.

Hailing from the state of Maranhão, in northeastern Brazil, Zeca – short for José – grew up with music. He then went to a university to study Agronomy and was given the nickname "Baleiro" ("candyman"), because of his love for candy.

His first two records, Por Onde Andará Stephen Fry and Vô Imbolá, won gold status. The title track on Por Onde Andará Stephen Fry? (Where could Stephen Fry be?) was a reference to British actor Stephen Fry's flight from the stage play "Cellmates" in 1995, when he disappeared from the United Kingdom after bad reviews. Zeca won the 2000 Latin Grammys for "best pop album". In 2014, his live album Calma Aí, Coração - Ao Vivo was nominated for the same award, but in the Best Música Popular Brasileira Album category, with the title song being nominated for the Best Brazilian Song category. He currently resides in São Paulo. In 2019, he received another Latin Grammy nomination for Best MPB Album, this time for O Amor no Caos. In 2021, he received another nomination in the same category, this time for the album Canções d'Além Mar.

Discography
Por Onde Andará Stephen Fry? (1997)
Vô Imbolá (1999)
Líricas (2000)
Pet Shop Mundo Cão (2002)
Raimundo Fagner e Zeca Baleiro (with Raimundo Fagner, 2003)
Daqui prá lá, de lá prá cá, (2003)
Perfil, 2003)
Baladas do Asfalto e Outros Blues (2005)
Baladas do Asfalto e Outros Blues - Ao Vivo (2006)
Lado Z (2007)
O Coração do Homem Bomba Vol. 1 (2008)
O Coração do Homem Bomba Vol. 2 (2008)
O Disco do Ano (2012)
Lado Z Volume 2 (2012)
Ao vivo - Calma aí, coração (2014)
Era Domingo (2016)

References

External links
 Official website

1966 births
Living people
Brazilian songwriters
20th-century Brazilian male singers
20th-century Brazilian singers
Universal Records artists
Brazilian columnists
People from São Luís, Maranhão
21st-century Brazilian male singers
21st-century Brazilian singers
Brazilian male guitarists
Grammy Award winners
Latin music songwriters
Música Popular Brasileira singers
Música Popular Brasileira guitarists
Latin Grammy Award winners